

Notable winners of Miss Malaysia 
 Tengku Zanariah Tengku Ahmad (Miss International Malaya 1960) – Raja Permaisuri Agong of Malaysia from 1984 to 1989.
Yasmin Yusoff (Miss Universe Malaysia 1978) – veteran actress, singer, radio presenter, former model
Michelle Yeoh (Miss World Malaysia 1983) – international actress
Fazira Wan Chek (Miss World Malaysia 1992) – actress, singer, TV host, businesswoman, model
Rahima Orchient Yayah (Miss World Malaysia 1994) – businesswoman, former model
Soo Wincci (Miss World Malaysia 2008) – actress, singer, model
Thanuja Ananthan (Miss World Malaysia 2009) – model, TV host, actress, humanitarian activist
Deborah Henry (Miss Universe Malaysia 2011) – motivational speaker, TV host, humanitarian activist, former model
Rubini Sambanthan (Miss International Malaysia 2014) – model, actress
Dewi Liana Seriestha (Miss World Malaysia 2014) – won Miss World Talent award in Miss World 2014 which then making her the first woman from Malaysia to receive the special award.
Alexis Sue-Ann Seow (Miss World Malaysia 2019) – model, emcee, fashion blogger
Francisca Luhong James (Miss Universe Malaysia 2020) – the first indigenous woman to win the title of Miss Universe Malaysia.
Nisha Thayananthan (Miss Earth Malaysia 2021) – full-time doctor, part time model
Lavanya Sivaji (Miss World Malaysia 2021) – full-time doctor, model

Miss Malaya 
Before Malaysia was formed, Malaysian representatives represented the whole nation with a title of "Miss Malaya".

Color keys

Miss Malaya Universe

Miss Malaya International

Titleholders at Big Four pageants 

Malaysia has been represented in the Big Four international beauty pageants since 1960. These are Miss World, Miss Universe, Miss International and Miss Earth.

Representative to Miss Universe

Representative to Miss World

Representative to Miss International

Representative to Miss Earth

Dewi Malaysia

Representative to Miss Planet International

Miss Supranational

Miss Grand Malaysia 

Color keys

Representative to Miss Grand International

Representative to The Miss Globe 
In 2017, the first runner-up was sent to Miss Intercontinental pageant. In 2018 and 2019, the runners-up were unable to compete at international level due to lack of sponsorship. Started from 2021, the first runner-up of Miss Grand Malaysia pageant will be sent to The Miss Globe pageant.

Representative to Miss Intercontinental 
Since 2018, the second runner-up of Miss Grand Malaysia pageant will compete Miss Intercontinental pageant.

Miss Malaysia Tourism Pageant 
Color keys

Representative to Miss Tourism International

Representative to Miss Tourism Queen of the Year International

Representative to Miss Tourism Metropolitan International

Representative to Miss South East Asia Tourism Ambassadress

Fatwa ruling in Malaysia 
In Malaysia, female Muslims were denied participation in beauty pageants following the issue of a fatwa in 1996 by the Mufti of Selangor, Ishak Baharom. The issue came to a nasty twist in July - September 1997 when four Malay participants joined the Miss Malaysian petite contest, only to be arrested by the authorities. In the ensuing public outcry and debate that followed, the effectiveness of the fatwa was shown given the influence of the Selangor's Mufti over the nation's sharia law. The fatwa resonated with the ideology that Muslim women should cover up private parts of their body, or Aurat of which the beauty pageants' practices ran contrary to - even though such religious enactments also apply to male pageants.

In Kuala Lumpur on 21 July 2013, the organisers of Miss Malaysia World 2013 were forced to drop four of its Muslim finalists following a fatwa prohibiting Muslim women from joining beauty pageants. According to Wan Zahidi, the fatwa prohibiting Muslim women from joining beauty pageants was issued and gazetted under the Federal Territories Islamic Administration Act in February 1996.

In recent years, the National Fatwa Council, the country's highest Islamic body, had also issued rulings forbidding Muslims from using Botox and banned women from exhibiting tomboy behaviour, which it defined as behaving or dressing like men or taking part in lesbian sex.

The council came under heavy scrutiny for its proposal to ban yoga after a university lecturer advised people to stop practising it for fear that it could deviate from the teachings of Islam. The move was met with protests from progressive Muslim women's groups like Sisters in Islam who deemed the fatwas regressive while observers claimed it highlighted the worrying trend of overt Islamisation in Malaysia.

The four contestants are:
 Wafa Johanna de Korte, 19, Kuala Lumpur
 Sara Amellia Bernard, 20, Perak
 Miera Sheikh, 19, Malacca
 Kathrina Binti Ridzuan, 24, Kuala Lumpur
Nevertheless, a public outcry ensued, as members of the public questioned the way the religious authorities handled the matter as well as the abrupt ruling which came about – Muslim women in the past had participated in beauty pageants without much protest amongst the religious authorities. This invoked the concerns of Mahathir's who had raised objections to the way the religious authorities had implemented and enforced the law – and questions including distinctions on religious laws and personal freedom were raised. Nevertheless, the fatwa ruling has since been very effective; Muslim women have since then been deterred from joining any beauty pageants. Malaysian beauty pageants, in compliance with the law, similarly denied Muslim individuals from participating. However, Muslim women may still join smaller scale beauty pageant contests such as Dewi Remaja, Miss Intercontinental, and Miss Tourism International, provided that they don't display publicly wearing swimsuits.

See also 
 Miss Universe Malaysia
 Miss World Malaysia
 Miss International Malaysia
 Miss Earth Malaysia
 Mister Malaysia
 Unduk Ngadau
 Dewi Remaja

References

External links
 Miss Universe Malaysia Official website
 Miss World Malaysia Official website

Malaysian awards
Recurring events established in 1960
1960 establishments in Malaya
Miss Universe Malaysia
Beauty pageants in Malaysia
Malaysian
Malaysian
Malaysian
Malaysian
Malaysian